The Kalyani M4 is a mine-protected, high-mobility armoured personnel carrier produced by Kalyani Group's Bharat Forge. It is a license made version of Mbombe 4 which is built by the South African Paramount group. 

After conducting extensive trials in Ladakh, Indian Army placed orders for these vehicles under an emergency procurement amidst China-India Border Standoff in a contract worth ₹177.95 Crores ($US23.6 million).

Design

The Kalyani M4 is designed predominantly as an extraction and occupant protection vehicle. Its design offers high speed and quick manoeuvrability. It has a maximum payload of 2.3 tonnes and can carry up to 8 people. With all the armour, the M4 weighs around 16,000 Kg. It has a 43-degree approach and 44-degrees departure angle with a water wading depth of 900 mm to operate it in tough terrain or fording rivers 

The Kalyani M4 uses a turbocharged 6-pot diesel motor which is rated to deliver 465hp and a 1627 Nm of torque. It uses a CVT automatic transmission. It also features a low-range gearbox to work with the 4×4 system to scale difficult steep inclines. The M4 has top speed of 140 km/h and has a range of 800 km.

It can withstand three 10 kg TNT charges under the wheels and one 50 kg IED Blast at its one side.

Operators

Indian Army – 60+. Additional units are on order.

See also 
 Ashok Leyland Light Bullet Proof Vehicles(LBPV)
 Mahindra Axe
 Mahindra Armored Light Specialist Vehicle
 Mahindra Marksman
 TATA Kestrel
 TATA Quick Reaction Fighting Vehicle

References 

Military vehicles of India